This is the discography of American jazz musician Paul Motian.

As leader 

 Conception Vessel (ECM, 1972 [1973])
 Tribute (ECM, 1974)
 Dance (ECM, 1977 [1978])
 Le Voyage (ECM, 1979)
 Psalm (ECM, 1981 [1982])
 The Story of Maryam (Soul Note, 1983 [1984])
 Jack of Clubs (Soul Note, 1984 [1985])
 It Should've Happened a Long Time Ago (ECM, 1984 [1985])
 Misterioso (Soul Note, 1986 [1987])
 One Time Out (Soul Note, 1987 [1989])
 Monk in Motian (JMT, 1988 [1989])
 On Broadway Volume 1 (JMT, 1988 [1989])
 On Broadway Volume 2 (JMT, 1989)
 Bill Evans (JMT, 1990)
 Motian in Tokyo (JMT, 1991)
 On Broadway Volume 3 (JMT, 1991 [1993])
 Paul Motian and the Electric Bebop Band (JMT, 1992 [1993])
 Trioism (JMT, 1993 [1994])
 Reincarnation of a Love Bird (JMT, 1994)
 At the Village Vanguard (JMT, 1995)
 Sound of Love (Winter & Winter, 1995 [1997])
 Flight of the Blue Jay (Winter & Winter, 1996 [1997])
 Trio 2000 + One (Winter & Winter, 1997 [1998])
 Play Monk and Powell (Winter & Winter, 1998 [1999])
 Europe (Winter & Winter, 2000 [2001])
 Holiday for Strings (Winter & Winter, 2001 [2002])
 I Have the Room Above Her (ECM, 2004 [2005])
 Garden of Eden (ECM, 2004 [2007])
 On Broadway Vol. 4 or The Paradox of Continuity (Winter & Winter, 2005)
 Time and Time Again (ECM, 2006)
 Live at the Village Vanguard (Winter & Winter, 2006 [2007])
 Live at the Village Vanguard Vol. II (Winter & Winter, 2006 [2008])
 Live at the Village Vanguard Vol. III (Winter & Winter, 2006 [2010])
 On Broadway Volume 5  (Winter & Winter, 2009)
 Lost in a Dream (ECM, 2010)
 The Windmills of Your Mind (Winter & Winter, 2011)

Compilations
 Selected Recordings (ECM, 2004)

Box Sets
 Paul Motian - The Complete Remastered Recordings On Black Saint & Soul Note (Compr. the six albums for Soul Note, CAM Jazz, 2010)
 Paul Motian on Broadway Vol. 1, 2, 3, 4, 5 (Rec. 1988–2008, Winter & Winter, 2012)
 Old & New Masters Edition: Paul Motian (Six albums rec. 1972–1984, ECM, 2013)

With Tethered Moon (Trio with Masabumi Kikuchi and Gary Peacock)
 First Meeting (Winter & Winter, 1990–91, [1997])
 Tethered Moon (King/Paddle Wheel, 1991 [1992]; Evidence, 1993)
 Triangle (King/Paddle Wheel, 1991 [1992])
 Tethered Moon Play Kurt Weill (JMT, 1994 [1995]; reissued on Winter & Winter, 2005)
 Plays Jimi Hendrix+ (Polydor/Media Rings, 1997 [1998])
 Chansons d’Édith Piaf (Winter & Winter, 1999 [1999]) 
 Experiencing Tosca (Winter & Winter, 2002 [2004])

As sideman 
With Michael Adkins
 Rotator (HatHut, 2008) with Russ Lossing and John Hébert
With Geri Allen and Charlie Haden
 Etudes (Soul Note, 1987); Haden and Motian credited ahead of Allen
 In the Year of the Dragon (JMT, 1989)
 Segments (DIW, 1989)
 The Montreal Tapes: with Geri Allen and Paul Motian (Verve, 1989 [1997]); issued under Haden's name
 Live at the Village Vanguard (DIW, 1991)
With Mose Allison
 I Love the Life I Live (Columbia, 1960)
 Wild Man on the Loose (Atlantic, 1965)
 The Earth Wants You (Blue Note, 1993)
 Gimcracks and Gewgaws (Blue Note, 1997)
With Tim Berne
 Songs and Rituals in Real Time (Empire, 1982; reissue by Screwgun, 1998) with Mack Goldsbury and Ed Schuller
 The Ancestors (Soul Note, 1982) with Ray Anderson, Mack Goldsbury, C. Herb Robertson and Ed Schuller
 Mutant Variations (Soul Note, 1984) with C. Herb Robertson and Ed Schuller
With Samuel Blaser
 Consort in Motion (Kind of Blue, 2011) with Russ Lossing and Thomas Morgan
 Live at Cornelia Street Café (Blaser Music, 2021) with Russ Lossing and Eivind Opsvik
With Carla Bley
 Escalator Over The Hill (JCOA, 1971)
With Paul Bley
 Turns (Savoy, 1964) with John Gilmore and Gary Peacock (also in part on Improvising Artists’ Turning Point, 1975)
 Paul Bley with Gary Peacock (ECM, 1970)
 Fragments (ECM, 1986) with Bill Frisell and John Surman
 Notes (Soul Note, 1987)
 The Paul Bley Quartet (ECM, 1987) with Bill Frisell and John Surman
 Memoirs (Soul Note, 1990) with Charlie Haden
 Zen Palace (Transheart, 1993) with Steve Swallow
 Not Two, Not One (ECM, 1998) with Gary Peacock
With Salvatore Bonafede
 Plays (Ken Music, 1991) with Marc Johnson
 For the Time Being (CAM Jazz, 2006) with Joe Lovano, Michele Rabbia, Mark Dresser and Adam Rogers
With Jakob Bro
 Balladeering (Loveland, 2009) with Bill Frisell, Lee Konitz and Ben Street
With Bob Brookmeyer
Jazz Is a Kick (Mercury, 1960)
With Guillaume de Chassy and Daniel Yvinec
 Songs from the Last Century (Bee Jazz, 2009) with Marc Murphy
With Anders Christensen
 Dear Someone (Stunt, 2010) with Aaron Parks
With Marc Copland
 New York Trio Recordings Vol.2: Voices (Pirouet, 2007) with Gary Peacock
With Chick Corea and Eddie Gómez
 Further Explorations (Universal Japan, 2011; international release by Concord Jazz, 2012)
With Eddie Costa
 Eddie Costa Quintet (Interlude, 1957)
 Guys and Dolls Like Vibes (Coral/Verve, 1958) with Bill Evans, Wendell Marshall
 The House of Blue Lights (Dot, 1959) with Wendell Marshall
With Marilyn Crispell
 Live in Zurich (Leo, 1990)
 Nothing Ever Was, Anyway: Music of Annette Peacock (ECM, 1997)
 Amaryllis (ECM, 2000)
 Storyteller (ECM, 2003)
With Furio Di Castri
 Unknown Voyage (A Tempo, 1988) with Joe Lovano
With Jakob Dinesen
 Around (Stunt, 2001) with Kurt Rosenwinkel
 Dino (Stunt, 2009) with Anders Christensen
With Bill Evans
 New Jazz Conceptions (Riverside, 1957)
 Portrait in Jazz (Riverside, 1959)
 Explorations (Riverside, 1961)
 Sunday at the Village Vanguard (Riverside, 1961)
 Waltz for Debby (Riverside, 1962)
 How My Heart Sings! (Riverside, 1962)
 Moon Beams (Riverside, 1962)
Nirvana with Herbie Mann (Atlantic, 1962)
 Trio 64 (Verve, 1963)
With Pierre Favre
 Singing Drums (ECM, 1984)
With Anat Fort
 A Long Story (ECM, 2004 [2007])
With Bill Frisell
 Rambler (ECM, 1985)
 Bill Frisell, Ron Carter, Paul Motian (Nonesuch, 2006)
 Bill Frisell, Ron Carter, Paul Motian EP (Nonesuch, 2006) - Download exclusive
With Larry Goldings
 Awareness (Warner Bros, 1997) with Larry Grenadier
With Alexandra Grimal
 Owls Talk (Aparte/Harmonia Mundi, 2012) with Lee Konitz and Gary Peacock
With Charlie Haden
 Liberation Music Orchestra (Impulse!, 1969)
 Closeness (Horizon/Verve, 1976)
 The Ballad of the Fallen (ECM, 1982)
The Private Collection (Naim, 1987-88 [2000])
 The Montreal Tapes: with Gonzalo Rubalcaba and Paul Motian (Verve, 1989 [1997])
 The Montreal Tapes: with Paul Bley and Paul Motian (Verve, 1989 [1994])
 The Montreal Tapes: Liberation Music Orchestra (Verve, 1989 [1997])
 Dream Keeper (Blue Note, 1989)
With Yuri Honing
 Seven (Jazz in Motion, 2001) with Paul Bley and Gary Peacock
With Keith Jarrett

 Life Between the Exit Signs (Vortex, 1967)
 Somewhere Before (Atlantic, 1968)
 The Mourning of a Star (Atlantic, 1971)
 El Juicio (The Judgement) (Atlantic, 1971)
 Birth (Atlantic, 1971)
 Expectations (Columbia, 1972)
 Hamburg '72 (ECM, 1972 [2014])
 Fort Yawuh (Impulse!, 1973)
 Treasure Island (Impulse!, 1974)
 Back Hand (Impulse!, 1974)
 Death and the Flower (Impulse!, 1974)
 Mysteries (Impulse!, 1975)
 Shades (Impulse!, 1975)
 Bop-Be (Impulse!, 1976)
 The Survivors' Suite (ECM, 1976)
 Eyes of the Heart (ECM, 1979)
 At the Deer Head Inn (ECM, 1992) with Gary Peacock

With Masabumi Kikuchi 
(see also Tethered Moon)
 Sunrise (ECM, 2012) with Thomas Morgan
With Frank Kimbrough
 Play (Palmetto, 2006) with Masa Kamaguchi
With Lee Konitz (and Warne Marsh)
 Live at the Half Note (Verve, 1959 [1994]); Warne Marsh's solos from these recordings were issued as The Art of Improvising (Revelation, 1959 [1974})
With Lee Konitz, Brad Mehldau and Charlie Haden
 Live at Birdland (ECM, 2009)
With Lee Konitz and Steve Swallow
 Three Guys (Enja, 1999)
With Rudy Linka
 Songs with Larry Grenadier
With Russ Lossing
 Dreamer (Double Time, 2000)
 As It Grows (HatHut, 2004)
With Joe Lovano
 Village Rhythm (Soul Note, 1988) with Kenny Werner, Tom Harrell and Marc Johnson
 Worlds (Label Bleu, 1989; reissued by Evidence Music, 1995) with Bill Frisell, Tim Hagens, Gary Valente, Judi Silvano, Henri Texier
 I'm All For You (Blue Note, 2004) with Hank Jones and George Mraz
 Joyous Encounter (Blue Note, 2005) with Hank Jones and George Mraz
With Warne Marsh
Warne Marsh (Atlantic, 1958)
With Bill McHenry
 Bill McHenry Quartet Featuring Paul Motian (Fresh Sound, 2002)
 Roses (Sunny Side, 2007)
 Ghosts of the Sun (Sunny Side, 2011)
With Helen Merrill
You and the Night and the Music (Verve, 1998)
With Sam Most
 Most Plays Monk Bird & Miles (Bethlehem (US), Parlophone (UK), 1958)
With Simon Nabatov
 Circle the Line (GM, 1986) and Ed Schuller, Arto Tuncboyaci
With Stéphan Oliva and Bruno Chevillon
 Fantasm - The Music of Paul Motian (BMG France/RCA Victor, 2000)
 Intérieur nuit (Night Bird, 2002)
With John Patitucci
 One More Angel (Concord, 1997)
With Enrico Pieranunzi
 Untold Story (IDA, 1993; reissue EGEA, 2006) with Marc Johnson
 Flux and Change (Soul Note, 1995)
 The Night Gone By (Alfa Jazz, 1996) with Marc Johnson
 Fellini Jazz (CAM Jazz, 2003) with Kenny Wheeler, Chris Potter and Charlie Haden
 Doorways (CAM Jazz, 2004) with Chris Potter
 Special Encounter (CAM Jazz, 2005) with Charlie Haden
 New York Reflections: Live at Birdland (CAM Jazz, 2012) with Steve Swallow
 Live at the Village Vanguard (CAM Jazz, 2013) with Marc Johnson
With Augusto Pirodda
 No Comment (Jazzwerkstatt, 2011) with Gary Peacock
With Enrico Rava
 Tati (ECM, 2004)
 New York Days (ECM, 2008)
With Gonzalo Rubalcaba
 Discovery: Live at Montreux (Somethin' Else/Blue Note, 1991) with Charlie Haden
With Roswell Rudd
 Blown Bone (Philips, 1979)
With Jacob Sacks and Eivind Opsvik
 Two Miles a Day (Yeah Yeah, 2005) with Mat Maneri
With Saheb Sarbib
 Seasons (Soul Note, 1982) with Mark Whitecage and Mel Ellison
With Zoot Sims
Jazz Alive! A Night at the Half Note (United Artists, 1959) with Al Cohn and Phil Woods
With Martial Solal
 At Newport '63 (RCA Victor, 1963)
 Just Friends (Dreyfus, 1997) with Gary Peacock
 Balade du 10 Mars (Soul Note, 1999) with Marc Johnson
With Martin Speake
 Change of Heart (ECM, 2002) with Bobo Stenson and Mick Hutton
With Bobo Stenson
 Goodbye (ECM, 2005) with Anders Jormin
With Henri Texier
 Respect (Label Bleu, 1997) with Bob Brookmeyer, Lee Konitz and Steve Swallow
With Pietro Tonolo
 Portrait of Duke (Label Bleu, 2000) with Gil Goldstein and Steve Swallow
 Your Songs: The Music of Elton John (ObliqSound, 2007) with Gil Goldstein and Steve Swallow
With Eric Watson and Ed Schuller
 Conspiracy (Decca Records France, 1982)

References

Discographies of American artists
Jazz discographies